Henry Wu King-cheong, BBS, JP (born 22 August 1951, Hong Kong) was the member of the Provisional Legislative Council (1996–98) and Legislative Council in 1998–2000 for Financial Services. He was also the chairman of the Federation of Hong Kong and Kowloon Labour Unions from 1995 to 1999. He was also the member of the Chinese People's Political Consultative Conference National Committee, Hong Kong Housing Authority and councilor of the Hong Kong Polytechnic University. He worked closely with Beijing before the handover of Hong Kong and joined the Preparatory Committee for the Hong Kong Special Administrative Region which oversaw the last phrase of the transition of the sovereignty. He was appointed to the Provisional Urban Council (1997–99) and Eastern District Council (2000–08).

References

1951 births
Living people
Members of the Provisional Legislative Council
Members of the Urban Council of Hong Kong
District councillors of Eastern District
University of Toronto alumni
Hong Kong Progressive Alliance politicians
Members of the Selection Committee of Hong Kong
Members of the Election Committee of Hong Kong, 1998–2000
Members of the Election Committee of Hong Kong, 2000–2005
Members of the Election Committee of Hong Kong, 2007–2012
Members of the National Committee of the Chinese People's Political Consultative Conference
HK LegCo Members 2000–2004
Members of the Preparatory Committee for the Hong Kong Special Administrative Region
Hong Kong Affairs Advisors
Recipients of the Bronze Bauhinia Star